Presumed Innocent is the 2001 breakthrough album of Marcia Ball. It spent seven months on the Billboard blues chart and won the 2002 W.C. Handy Blues Award for Blues Album of the Year.

Track listing
 The Scene of the Crime 	3:11 	
 You Make It Hard 	4:01 	
 Count the Days 	3:29 	
 Let the Tears Roll Down 	5:43 	
 Louella 	4:27 	
 Fly on the Wall 	4:21 	
 I Have the Right to Know 	4:50 	
 Thibodaux, Louisiana 	3:30 	
 I'm Coming Down with the Blues 	4:01 	
 Shake a Leg 	2:57 	
 Somebody to Love 	3:34 	
 She's So Innocent 	4:54 	
 You Make Me Happy

References

2001 albums
Marcia Ball albums
Alligator Records albums